The Girl in the Shack is a 1914 American silent short film directed by Edward Morrissey and written by Anita Loos. The film starred Earle Foxe, Spottiswoode Aitken, and Mae Marsh.

External links

American silent short films
1914 films
American black-and-white films
Films with screenplays by Anita Loos
1910s American films